Abderrazak Belgherbi (born 29 October 1961) is an Algerian footballer. He played in 16 matches for the Algeria national football team in 1987 and 1989. He was also named in Algeria's squad for the 1988 African Cup of Nations tournament.

References

External links
 

1961 births
Living people
Algerian footballers
Algeria international footballers
1988 African Cup of Nations players
Competitors at the 1987 Mediterranean Games
Mediterranean Games competitors for Algeria
People from Chlef
Association football defenders
21st-century Algerian people
20th-century Algerian people
ASO Chlef players